"What A Bam Bam" is a song recorded by Dominican-American singer Amara La Negra. It was released as a single on February 20, 2018, by Fast Life Entertainment Worldwide and BMG. The song was produced by DJ Mostwanted and features a sample by the reggae song "Bam Bam" by Sister Nancy. It peaked on Billboard at number 8 on the Latin Pop Digital Song Sales chart on March 3, 2018.

Music video
A music video to accompany the release of "What A Bam Bam" was released onto YouTube on March 16, 2019, at a total length of three minutes and twelve seconds. It was directed by Montoya el Duro and features scenes of a pool party located in Miami, Florida.

Charts

References 

Latin pop